Helen Kushnick ( Gorman; August 18, 1945 – August 28, 1996) was the talent agent of comedians Jimmie Walker, Elayne Boosler, and Jay Leno for much of her early career. Leno had been performing stand-up comedy in a variety of venues when she found him, and afterwards, Kushnick was with him all the way to his role hosting The Tonight Show.

Her strong-arm tactics in her role as executive producer of The Tonight Show created a great deal of conflict with NBC.  For example, she reportedly banned stars from appearing on the program if they appeared on any other talk show. These practices led to her dismissal only four months into her tenure in that position.

Kushnick died of breast cancer in Los Angeles on August 28, 1996, aged 51.

Filmography 
The Tonight Show with Jay Leno (1992) TV Series (executive producer)
Jay Leno and the American Dream (1986) (TV) (executive producer)

The Late Shift 
The 1996 HBO TV movie The Late Shift (based on Bill Carter's  New York Times bestselling book of the same title) uncovered the network politics that occurred prior to the retirement of Johnny Carson from The Tonight Show on NBC. The film starred Kathy Bates as Kushnick, who received an Emmy Award nomination for her role, and won a Golden Globe and Screen Actors Guild Award. Kushnick sued over her portrayal, and settled out of court for an undisclosed sum.

Family 
Kushnick's three-year-old son died in 1983 of AIDS due to an infected blood transfusion.

References

External links 

1996 deaths
1945 births
American women television producers
Deaths from cancer in California
Deaths from breast cancer
Television producers from New York City
Place of birth missing
20th-century American businesspeople
20th-century American businesswomen
The Tonight Show with Jay Leno
Jay Leno